The 2007 Future Cup was a 3 ODI cricket series between India and South Africa between 23 June and 1 July. The series was preceded by each team playing one match against Ireland.

Squads

Matches

Ireland Matches

1st match: Ireland vs India

2nd match: Ireland vs South Africa

ODI Series

1st match: India vs South Africa

2nd match: India vs South Africa

3rd match: India vs South Africa

Statistics
Most runs

References

 http://www.dailymotion.com/video/x2fxu7_3rd-odi-india-v-south-africa-sa-inn_sport

Future Cup, 2007
Future Cup, 2007